Zhao Haihong (born 1977) is a Chinese science fiction writer.

Life 
Zhao Haihong was born in Hangzhou in 1977 and graduated from the foreign languages department of Zhejiang University. She currently teaches Anglo-American literature at Zhejiang Gongshang University.

Work 
Zhao already started in high school to write her first short stories. Apart from science fiction, she has also published a number of martial arts stories.
For her science fiction stories, Zhao has received the Chinese Galaxy Award several times and her fans awarded her the unofficial title of "princess of Chinese science fiction." Zhao herself, however, stated that she found the labeling of "princess" problematic. Han Song proclaimed to be a fan of hers and praised her vivid literary style and her lifelike characters which he believes to be hardly matched in Chinese or international science fiction.

References 

1977 births
Living people
21st-century Chinese women writers
21st-century Chinese writers
Chinese science fiction writers
Writers from Hangzhou
Zhejiang University alumni
Women science fiction and fantasy writers